The Queensland stinkfish (Callionymus moretonensis)  is a species of dragonet native to the western Pacific Ocean where it can be found in the waters off of northwestern Australia, Papua New Guinea and Melanesia. This species grows to a length of  TL.

References 

M
Fish described in 1971